The House of Atreus Act I, released in 1999, is the ninth studio album by the American heavy metal band Virgin Steele. It has the subtitle A Barbaric-Romantic Opera. This album is the first part of a metal opera inspired by the Oresteia, a trilogy of Greek tragedies written by Aeschylus which concerns the end of the curse on the House of Atreus. The music was intended to be the soundtrack for theatrical shows, with actors impersonating the characters of the tragedy. The metal opera was actually performed under the name "Klytaimnestra - The House Of Atreus" in European theatres from 1999 to 2001, with the production of the Memmingen Opera House company and Landestheater Production.

The song "The Fire God" first appears on the 1986 Piledriver LP Stay Ugly.

Track listing
All songs by David DeFeis except tracks 5, 7, 8, 15 and 18 by DeFeis / Ed Pursino

Personnel

Band members
David DeFeis - all vocals, keyboards, orchestration, effects, producer
Edward Pursino - acoustic and electric guitars, bass
Frank Gilchriest - drums

Production
Steve Young, Ed Warrin - engineers
Michael Sarsfield - mastering

References

1999 albums
Virgin Steele albums
Rock operas
Noise Records albums
Works based on Agamemnon (Aeschylus play)